Cantilena Antiqua is an Italian early music group founded in 1987 and based in Bologna. The ensemble of 3 to 13 musicians is directed by musician and sound engineer Stefano Albarello. The ensemble's repertoire is primarily of medieval, renaissance and Andalusian music.

Discography
 Canticum canticorum, Symphonia (record label) SY 95135. Settings of the Song of Songs 12th-13th century.
 Claustrum beatitudinis, SY 95141. Latin Lauda (song) from the Bobbio Abbey, 13th-14th century.
 O spem miram, ("O wonderful hope") SY 96145. Office and mass for Saint Dominic according to the song of the Dominican Order, 13th century.
 Aines, ("Agnes"). Medieval mystery play of Saint Agnes of Rome from Provence, 14th century. (Live recording) SY 99165
 Ballate e madrigali, al tempo della Signoria di Paolo Guinigi Tactus Records 400002. - A collection of ballatas and early madrigal (music)s, during the lordship of Paolo Guinigi in Lucca 15th century.
 Ondas do mar. ("Waves of the sea") Symphonia (record label), 1998; SY 96157. Andalusian classical music and Cantigas de amigo of Martin Codax. reissued as "Insiraf" (literally "departure"). Pan Classics, Switzerland. 2011.
 Epos - Music of the Carolingian Era
 Joys Amors Chants. Passacaille Records

References

Early music groups